Mind Warp was Patrick Cowley's third and final studio album. Composed in 1982, it is in the uptempo Hi-NRG dance music style.

Track listing
All tracks written and composed by Patrick Cowley

 "Tech-No-Logical World" - 7:43
 "Invasion" - 6:44
 "They Came at Night" - 6:12
 "Mind Warp" - 6:36
 "Primitive World" - 3:01
 "Mutant Man" - 5:23
 "Goin' Home" - 5:36
 "Invasion" (Remix) - 6:21
 "Mind Warp" (Remix) - 7:57
 "Goin' Home" (Remix) - 8:37
 "Tech-No-Logical World" (Instrumental) - 7:28
 "Tech-No-Logical World" (Radio Edit) - 3:36
 Tracks 8-12 are CD bonus tracks

Personnel
Patrick Cowley - all instruments, arrangements
Jo-Carol Block, Lauren Carter, Paul Parker - vocals
Erica Buffett, J. Forrest Knight, Jeff Mehl, Jim Saunders, Jo-Carol Block, John Hedges, Lauren Carter, Mary Buffett, Michael Bailey, Nicole Buffett, Peter Buffett, Stacey Sudduth - vocal chants ("Primitive World")
James "Tip" Wirrick - guitar
David Frazier - additional percussion
Technical
Marty Blecman - Associate Producer
Leslie Ann Jones, Maureen Droney - Engineering
Gordon Lyon - Second Engineer
Ken Kessie - Mixing
Robert L. Missbach - Recording
José Rodriguez - Mastering
Jim Saunders - Cover, Label, Sleeve
David Wellers - Lithography
Leland Dale Saunders - Moon Photos

References

1982 albums
Patrick Cowley albums